The FIBT World Championships 1993 took place in Igls, Austria (Bobsleigh) and La Plagne, France (Skeleton). This was Igls's fourth time hosting the championships, doing so previously in 1935 (Two-man) and 1963, and 1991 (Skeleton). Meanwhile, La Plagne was hosting its first championship event.

Selection issue
Igls was not the first choice for the bobsleigh part of the championships. In 1989, Cervinia, Italy was chosen over Winterberg, Germany (then in West Germany), but Cervinia later withdrew and Igls was awarded as a substitute.

Two man bobsleigh

Four man bobsleigh

The United States earned their first championship medal since 1969.

Men's skeleton

Medal table

References
2-Man bobsleigh World Champions
4-Man bobsleigh World Champions
Men's skeleton World Champions
1989 Olympic Review article on FIBT originally awarding the 1993 championship to Cervinia, Italy. - accessed April 23, 2008.

1993
1993 in Austrian sport
1993 in French sport
1993 in bobsleigh
1993 in skeleton
International sports competitions hosted by Austria
Bobsleigh in Austria 
International sports competitions hosted by France
Bobsleigh in France
Skeleton in France